West Africa Time, or WAT, is a time zone used in west-central Africa. West Africa Time is one hour ahead of Coordinated Universal Time (UTC+01:00), which aligns it with Central European Time (CET) during winter, and Western European Summer Time (WEST) / British Summer Time (BST) during summer.

As most of this time zone is in the tropical region, there is little change in day length throughout the year and therefore daylight saving time is not observed.

West Africa Time is the time zone for the following countries:
 (as Central European Time)
 
 
 
 
 
 (western side only)
 
 
 (as Central European Time)
 
 
 
 (as Central European Time)
 

Countries west of Benin (except Morocco and Western Sahara) are in the UTC±0 time zone. Civil time in most of those countries is defined with reference to Greenwich Mean Time (now an alias for UTC±0, rather than an independent reference).

References

See also
 Central European Time, an equivalent time zone covering most European countries during winter, also at UTC+01:00
 Western European Summer Time, an equivalent time zone covering western European countries during daylight saving, also at UTC+01:00
 British Summer Time, an equivalent time zone covering the United Kingdom during daylight saving, also at UTC+01:00

African culture
Time zones
Time in Africa